Alexander McLachlan (1818–1896) was a Scottish-born Canadian poet who was active in the mid-nineteenth century and wrote in both Scottish dialect and poetic convention of the homesickness of Scottish immigrants to Canada. Both his contemporary and later critics have called him "the Canadian Robert Burns", after a Scottish national poet who also authored Scottish traditional verse.  McLachlan's bound verse includes the titles The Spirit of Love (1846), Lyrics (1858), The Emigrant (1861) and Poems and Songs (1871).

McLachlan was born in Johnstone, Scotland, to Charles McLachlan and Jean Sutherland. At some point in the 1830s, he died, leaving Alexander his land. McLachlan immigrated in 1840. One year later he married his cousin Clamina, and went on to have eleven children.

Works available in classic reprint
Alexander McLachlan, Lyrics, Kessinger Publishing, LLC, 2007 
Alexander McLachlan, The Emigrant and Other Poems, Forgotten Books, 2012 ASIN: B008522B64
Alexander McLachlan, Poetical Works [The Poetical Works of Alexander McLachlan (1900)], selected and edited with introd. biographical sketch, notes and glossary, Ulan Press, 2012, ASN: B00AE60W7M

References

External links
 McLachlan's Emigrant at Canadian Poetry.ca

1818 births
1896 deaths
Scottish poets
19th-century Canadian poets
Canadian male poets
Scottish emigrants to Canada
19th-century British male writers